Habitual Levitations (Instilling Words with Tones) is the fourth studio album by American progressive metal band Intronaut.  It was released 18 March 2013 in Europe and 19 March 2013 in North America on Century Media Records, which also released their previous two albums Prehistoricisms and Valley of Smoke.

Track listing

Personnel

Intronaut
Sacha Dunable – guitar, vocals
Dave Timnick – guitar, vocals
Danny Walker – drums
Joe Lester – bass

Production
John Haddad - recording engineer for drums
Derek Donley - recording engineer for guitars, bass, and vocals
Josh Newell - mixer
Paul Logus - master
David D'Andrea - layout

Release
The album is available as a digital download, CD and 12 inch double LP.  The track "Milk Leg" premiered on Invisible Oranges on 29 January 2013 and a video debuted on 5 February 2013. On 15 February 2013, "The Welding" was premiered on Pitchfork. On 1 March 2013, "The Way Down" premiered on the German music site, Visions.de.

References

2013 albums
Intronaut albums
Century Media Records albums